The South Australian Railways R class engine, later upgraded to Rx Class engine is a class of 4-6-0 steam engines operated by the South Australian Railways.

History
In 1886, Dübs and Company of Glasgow delivered the first six R class of engine. A further 24 engines had been built by James Martin & Co by November 1895. From 1899, all engines were rebuilt with higher powered Belpaire boilers and reclassified as Rx class engines. A further 54 locomotives were built as Rx class by the Islington Railway Workshops, North British Locomotive Company and Walkers Limited with all engines in service by May 1916.

The R class engines were the predominant locomotive used on broad gauge main line services in South Australia from their introduction. After the introduction of the large Webb engines they were relegated to secondary lines and services such as shunting and hauling goods trains and passenger trains. A large group of Rx class locomotives, mainly early builds, were withdrawn from service in 1934, however the remainder continued to serve into the mid 1960s.

Survivors
Several Rx class locomotives, including one original R class engine (Rx93), survive to this day in various states of preservation.
Rx5: plinthed at Kapunda
Rx55: preserved at Loxton
Rx93: preserved at National Railway Museum, Port Adelaide
Rx160: preserved at Murray Bridge
Rx191: plinthed at Victor Harbor
Rx201: plinthed at Tailem Bend
Rx207: preserved at SteamRanger, operational
Rx217: plinthed at Nuriootpa, South Australia
Rx224: preserved at SteamRanger, operational
Rx231: plinthed at Kadina

References

External links

Dübs locomotives
NBL locomotives
Railway locomotives introduced in 1886
R
Walkers Limited locomotives
4-6-0 locomotives
Broad gauge locomotives in Australia